Volodymyr Oleksiyovych Betz() ( – ) was a Ukrainian  anatomist and histologist, professor of the Saint Vladimir University (Kyiv, now Ukraine), famous for the discovery of giant pyramidal neurons of primary motor cortex.

Volodymyr Betz began his education in the Nizhyn Gymnasium (the Russian Empire at that time). Later he transferred to the 2nd Kyiv Gymnasium and graduated from it in 1853. In 1860 he received a physician's diploma from the Medicine faculty (now Bogomolets National Medical University) of Saint Vladimir University in Kyiv (now Taras Shevchenko National University of Kyiv) and was appointed a prosector's aide at the anatomy department. He went abroad to study in May 1861 and returned in September 1862, having studied with and attended the lectures of professors Brücke, Bunsen, Kölliker, Helmholtz, Kirchhoff. From 1864 to 1867 he lectures anatomy and histology at the university, rising in 1868 to the rank of Extraordinary Professor and in 1870 becoming Ordinary Professor of the anatomy department.

Brain tissue preparations made by Betz were awarded medals twice - at the All-Russian manufacturing exhibition in 1870 and at Vienna World Exposition of 1873. In 1874, Volodymyr Oleksiyovych described the giant pyramidal neurons in the primary motor cortex, which later were named Betz cells.

Betz' most prominent works include:
 "On the hepatic blood circulation" (1863)
 "A new method of human CNS exploration" (1870)
 "On the grouping of the convolutions of human brain" (1871)
 "Two centers in the human brain cortex" (1875)
 "An anatomy of the human brain surface, with an atlas and 86 tables" (1883)
 "Historical figures of the Russian South-West" (1883, coauthored by prof. B.A.Antonovych)

References 

1834 births
1894 deaths
People from Oster
Anatomists from the Russian Empire
Histologists
Russian neuroscientists
Academics from the Russian Empire
Medical writers
Inventors from the Russian Empire
Medical educators
Taras Shevchenko National University of Kyiv alumni
Biologists from the Russian Empire